Simon Kvamm (born 18 February 1975 in Silkeborg) is a Danish-Faroese actor and singer. He is best known as one of the founding members of the Danish rock band Nephew, where he is the lead vocalist and keyboard player. He is also well known for his acts in the Danish cult show Drengene fra Angora. He is also part of pop duo De Eneste To alongside Peter Sommer.

Early life

Kvamm graduated from Silkeborg Gymnasium in 1994. He trained and studied to become a journalist at the Danish School of Journalism in Aarhus, but did not end up completing the training. He had a spell as a football player with Olympia Århus København.

Career

Simon Kvamm is best known as one of the founding members of the Danish rock band Nephew, where he is the lead vocalist and keyboard player. The band had their breakthrough in 2004 with their second album USADSB, and had several hits in Denmark such as Superliga, En Wannabe Darth Vader and Movie Klip, which have won them several Danish national music awards, including 6 GAFFA awards (two of which were Best Danish Singer and Best Danish Band). In 2010, Simon formed the duo De Eneste To (literally The Sole Two in Danish) with his good friend and colleague of many years, Peter Sommer. The duo's first album, self-titled De Eneste To, had immediate success and was certified platinum in January 2011.

He is also known from the Danish comedy series Drengene fra Angora, where he plays the demented Dutch cyclist Pim de Keysersgracht, the motorcycle gang member Baune, one of the three Russians from joke hours Gagarin, and the studio host Simon (when he's Simon, he's mainly himself). Simon credits his acting with helping to develop his stage persona and create songs. He considers himself a musician first and an actor on the side.

Personal life

Kvamm is married to journalist Stine Ellerbæk, and together they have two daughters; Elinor Kvamm Ellerbæk (born 2 December 2006) and Alice (born in 2011). Simon has a brother, Stefan Kvamm, four years his junior, who is an anthropologist and musician in the underground band The Wong Boys. He currently resides in Klitmøller.

Discography

with Solo
Singles
Revner
Solo (feat. Aalborg Symfoniorkester
Albums
Vandmand (2017)

with Nephew

Singles
We Don't Need You Here
Superliga
Ordenspoliti
Movie Klip
En Wannabe Darth Vader
Worst/ Best Case Scenario
Byens Hotel
Igen og Igen
Science Fiction Og Familien
Mexico Ligger I Spanien
Hospital feat. L.O.C.
Timbaland vs. Nephew: The Way I Are
Allein Alene (Allein Allein by Polarkreis 18): Remixed by Nephew and Carsten Heller
007 Is Also Gonna Die
Va Fangool!
Sov for Satan Mand
Police Bells And Church Sirens
The Danish Way to Rock feat. VM Landsholdet
Hjertestarter
Klokken 25

Albums
 Swimming Time (2000)
 USADSB (2004)
 USADSB 10 x så live (2004)
 Interkom Kom Ind (2006)
 Roskilde 07.07.07 (2007)
 Danmark/Denmark (2009)
 Hjertestarter (2012)

with De Eneste To
Singles
 Morten (2010)
 Jeg Har Ikke Lyst Til At Dø (2010)

Albums with "De Eneste To"
De Eneste To (2010)
Dobbeltliv (2014)
Friday I'm in Love - EP (2015)

with Drengene fra Angora
Albums
 Drengene fra Angora (2004)
 Angora by Night (2007)

with Other
 Trio Van Gogh (contributed a track) (2007)
 Anti Globetrotter (produced intro song with Carsten Heller) (2007)
 Peter and the Wolf (tells the tale with music by Danish Radio Big Band) (2008)
 L.O.C. - Melankolia / XXX Couture (involved in Superbia)

Filmography/Television

In addition, Simon Kvamm can also be seen playing minor roles in things that Esben Pretzmann and/or Rune Tolsgaard wrote.

References

External links

Official website: 

Silkeborg library literary portal (in Danish): 
Simon Kvamm on Film Database (in Danish): 
Simon Kvamm on danskefilm.dk (in Danish): 

1975 births
Living people
Danish male actors
Danish male comedians
People from Silkeborg
Danish people of Faroese descent
21st-century Danish male  singers